The 2022–23 Arizona Wildcats women's basketball team will represent the University of Arizona during the 2022–23 NCAA Division I women's basketball season. The Wildcats will be led by seventh-year head coach Adia Barnes. This will be the Wildcats' 49th season at the on-campus McKale Center in Tucson, Arizona and 44th season as a member of the Pac-12 Conference.

Previous season 

The Wildcats finished the 2021–22 season with a record of 21–8, 10–6 in Pac-12 play. The Wildcats were invited to the 2022 NCAA tournament where they defeated UNLV in the first round before losing to North Carolina in the second round.

Offseason

Departures

Outgoing Transfers

Acquisitions

Incoming Transfers

2022 recruiting class

2023 recruiting class

Preseason

Preseason rankings

Source:

Preseason All-conference teams 

 

Source:

Award watch lists 
Listed in the order that they were released

Personal

Roster 
Source:

 
 

 

Junior Lauren Ware to miss 22–23 season with a knee injury.

Support staff

Schedule

|-
!colspan=12 style=| Exhibition 
 

|-
!colspan=12 style=| Non-conference regular season

|-
!colspan=12 style=| Pac-12 regular season

|-
!colspan=12 style=|Pac-12 Women's Tournament

|-
!colspan=12 style=|NCAA Women's Tournament

Source:

Pac-12 tournament

* denotes overtime period</onlyinclude>

NCAA tournament

* denotes overtime period</onlyinclude>

Awards and honors

Midseason awards watchlists

Final awards watchlists

Postseason

National awards

Sources:

Media coverage

Radio
ESPN Tucson - 1490 AM & 104.09 FM (ESPN Radio) and Nationwide - Dish Network, Sirius XM, Varsity Network and iHeartRadio)
KCUB 1290 AM – Football Radio Show – (Tucson, AZ)
KHYT – 107.5 FM (Tucson, AZ)
KTKT 990 AM – La Hora de Los Gatos (Spanish) – (Tucson, AZ)
KGME 910 AM – (IMG Sports Network) – (Phoenix, AZ)
KTAN 1420 AM – (Sierra Vista, AZ)
KDAP 96.5 FM (Douglas, Arizona)
KWRQ 102.3 FM – (Safford, AZ/Thatcher, AZ)
KIKO 1340 AM – (Globe, AZ)
KVWM 970 AM – (Show Low, AZ/Pinetop-Lakeside, AZ)
XENY 760 – (Nogales, Sonora) (Spanish)
KTZR (1450 AM) - (FoxSports 1450) - (Tucson, AZ)

TV 
CBS Family – KOLD (CBS), CBSN 
ABC/ESPN Family – KGUN (ABC), ABC, ESPN, ESPN2, ESPNU, ESPN+, 
FOX Family – KMSB (FOX), FOX/FS1, FSN 
Pac-12 Network (Pac-12 Arizona)
NBC Family – KVOA, NBC Sports, NBCSN
PBS - KUAT
Univision - KUVE (Spanish) 
Telemundo - KHRR (Spanish)

Rankings

See also
2022–23 Arizona Wildcats men's basketball team

Notes

References

Arizona Wildcats women's basketball seasons
Arizona
Arizona Wildcats women's basketball
Arizona Wildcats women's basketball
Arizona